The Siluro San Bartolomeo (St. Bartholomew Torpedo) was an Italian Human Torpedo designed during World War II, used by the Decima Flottiglia MAS for commando style operations. When using the Siluro a Lenta Corsa Maiale Human Torpedo had noticed some limitations, demonstrating the need for an updated version. The project was managed and developed by the engineer of the Genio Naval, Mayor Mario Masciulli, with the help of Captain G.N Travaglino and engineer Guido Cattaneo. The improvement in the materials available for the assembly and parallel new technologies led to a far superior product to the point of not being able to identify and as an outgrowth of the "Siluro a Lenta Corsa" SLC Maiale.

Just three Siluro San Bartolomeo had been manufactured before the date of the Armistice between Italy and Allied armed forces; two remained in La Spezia and one which was sent to Venice was found at the end of the war. Both of La Spezia were consigned to the La Castagna Task Force, an old battery of the Decima Flottiglia MAS under the command of Lieutenant Augusto Jacobacci (Siluro San Bartolomeo pilot). Those had been designated to attack Gibraltar, but the action was suspended with the armistice.

Further reading

External links
Siluro a lenta corsa SLC

World War II military equipment of Italy
Torpedoes
Frogman operations
Caproni